During the 1970s and 1980s, Australian women's basketball was successful in terms of attracting participants and having a competitive team on the international stages. This success did not translate into sponsorship and financial support for the sport.

The WNBL was founded during the early 1980s to help improve the quality of the domestic play with the hope of providing a pathway for top Australian players to join the national team.

Aboriginal women
Aboriginal women who have played basketball on a high level include Joanne Lesiputty.  Lesiputty quit the sport to pursue a softball career. Laura Agius was an aboriginal basketball player who represented South Australia. Leonie Dickson and Bobbie Dillon, both Tasmanians, also represented their state on the national level.

Wheelchair basketball

Women have been active in playing wheelchair basketball in Australia for several years.  They first appeared on the Paralympic seen at the 1992 Summer Paralympics, despite women's wheelchair basketball being competed for at the Paralympics since 1968.  Notable players include Liesl Tesch and Donna Ritchie.

Professional basketball
Women's basketball is nominally a professional sport in Australia.  In 2009, the salaries for average players in the WNBL were not high enough to allow them to play basketball full-time: They made between $5,000 - $10,000 a year.

Women's National Basketball League

Overseas players
Australian athletes have gone overseas to play professional sport.  Amongst these are Lauren Jackson, Erin Phillips, Kristi Harrower, Belinda Snell, Penny Taylor and Liz Cambage, all of whom have played basketball in the United States.

Spectatorship
During the 2010/2011 season, the Women's National Basketball League had 77,944 total spectators watch a game live.  On television that season, the league had an aggregate of 1,352,096 total viewers.

National team

In 1984, the national team competed at the 1984 Summer Olympics.  This was their first appearance at the Olympic Games.  Comparatively, their male counterparts first competed at the 1956 Summer Olympics.

In 1988, the national team beat the Soviet Union's national team.  This was a historic win for the team. The game was played at the 1988 Summer Olympics and qualified Australia for the semi-finals.

This was the roster for the 2008 Beijing Olympics.

|}
| valign="top" |
 Head coach

 Assistant coach(es)

Legend
(C) Team captain
nat field describes country of last club before the tournament
Age field is age on 9 August 2008
|}

References

 
Articles containing video clips